Minuit may refer to:

 MINUIT, a numerical minimization program created at CERN
 Minuit (band), from New Zealand
 Peter Minuit, Dutch settler known for purchasing Manhattan in 1626
 Midnight in French
 Les Éditions de Minuit, French publishing house
 Minuit (Op. 168), a polka by Émile Waldteufel